Dendrophilia mediofasciana is a moth of the family Gelechiidae. It was described by Kyu-Tek Park in 1991. It is found in Russia (Primorskii krai), Korea and Honshu, Japan.

The wingspan is 11–13 mm.

The larvae feed on Lespedeza bicolor.

References

mediofasciana
Moths described in 1991
Moths of Japan